Radical 113 or radical spirit meaning ancestor or veneration is number 113 out of the 214 Kangxi radicals. It is one of the 23 radicals composed of 5 strokes. When appearing at the left side of a character, the radical transforms into  (consisting of 4 strokes) in modern Chinese and Japanese jōyō kanji.

The compound form 礻 always appears in the left half of the characters.

In the Kangxi Dictionary, there are 213 characters (out of 49,030) to be found under this radical.

 is also the 100th indexing component in the Table of Indexing Chinese Character Components predominantly adopted by Simplified Chinese dictionaries published in mainland China, with the left component form  being its associated indexing component.

The character  represents an altar or offering table, the top stroke depicting the offered goods. In the oracle bone script, the table has a  shape.

The sign  for "evil spirit" originally referred to misfortune caused by malevolent spirits.

Similarly,  "spirit" has radical 113 plus 申 (shēn) as a phonetic marker. "ancestor" on the other hand has radical 113 plus , a pictograph of a stand with shelves for offerings to ancestors.

Some signs including the radical have no connection with spirits or animism and are placed in the category purely on formal grounds, such as 票 "ticket" which originally had radical 火 rather than 示.

Evolution

Derived characters

Variant forms

This radical takes different forms in different languages or characters.

When used as a left component, traditionally, only ⺬ was used in printing, while 礻 was overwhelmingly preferred in writing regular script. In the Kangxi Dictionary,  was chosen as the standard form.

In mainland China, after the adoption of simplified Chinese characters and xin zixing (new character forms), which used to be a handwriting form, became the standard xin zixing printing form (e.g.).

However, this simplification applies only to jōyō kanji. While JIS X 0208:1983 simplified some hyōgai kanji with the left component  (e.g. ), this change was not in conformity with the Publishing Standard Glyphs of hyōgai kanji released by the National Language Council in 2000 and was undone in later versions of JIS. Hyōgai kanji with the simplified form  are often seen as extended shinjitai. Both forms are acceptable when writing hyōgai kanji, but only the simplified form is recognized as the standard form in jōyō kanji.

The left component form is not simplified in Korean hanja (e.g.).

The radical also has different variants when appearing independently or at the bottom of a character.

In the Kangxi Dictionary,  as an independent character does not have a hook in its third stroke, while the hook exists when the radical is used as a component. Both forms have traditionally been widely used for printing and handwriting, while in modern times, different authorities have prescribed different forms as their standards. The hook does not exist in Taiwan's Standard Form of National Characters, exists in Mainland China's Guo Biao standard, Japanese kanji, and Korean hanja.

Literature 

Leyi Li: “Tracing the Roots of Chinese Characters: 500 Cases”. Beijing 1993,

External links

Unihan Database - U+793A

See also
Chinese numerals
Ancestor Veneration in China
Radical 194 ( "ghost")

113
100
示